Lycée Français de Tripoli (LFT) is a French international school in Tripoli, Libya. It serves levels maternelle through lycée (senior high school/sixth form).

It closed during the 2012–2013 school year due to the Libyan Crisis, and has remained closed.

References

External links
  Lycée Français de Tripoli Libye
  "Devenir des élèves de l’école et du lycée français à Tripoli." Assemblée des Français de l'étranger
  "Le Lycée Français de Tripoli ." Embassy of France in Tripoli.
  "Libye : l'école française de Tripoli fermée jusqu'à l'été 2014 par sécurité." Agence France Presse at L'Orient-Le Jour. 23 May 2013.

Tripoli
International schools in Tripoli, Libya
Educational institutions in Canada with year of establishment missing